The Voluntary Militia for National Security (MVSN), commonly called the Blackshirts (CCNN,) or , was originally the paramilitary wing of the National Fascist Party, known as the Squadrismo, and after 1923 an all-volunteer militia of the Kingdom of Italy under Fascist rule, similar to the SA. Its members were distinguished by their black uniforms (modelled on those of the Arditi, Italy's elite troops of World War I) and their loyalty to Benito Mussolini, the Duce (leader) of Fascism, to whom they swore an oath. The founders of the paramilitary groups were nationalist intellectuals, former army officers and young landowners opposing peasants' and country labourers' unions. Their methods became harsher as Mussolini's power grew, and they used violence and intimidation against Mussolini's opponents. In 1943, following the fall of the Fascist regime, the MVSN was integrated into the Royal Italian Army and disbanded.

History

The Blackshirts were established as the Squadrismo in 1919 and consisted of many disgruntled former soldiers. It was given the task of leading fights against their bitter enemies – the Socialists. They may have numbered 200,000 by the time of Mussolini's March on Rome from 27 to 29 October 1922. In 1922 the squadristi were reorganized into the milizia and formed numerous bandiere, and on 1 February 1923 the Blackshirts became the Voluntary Militia for National Security (Milizia Volontaria per la Sicurezza Nazionale, or MVSN), which lasted until 8 September 1943 Armistice of Cassibile. The Italian Social Republic, located in the areas of northern Italy occupied by Germany, reformed the MVSN on 8 December 1943 into the National Republican Guard (Guardia Nazionale Repubblicana, or GNR).

Organization

Benito Mussolini was the leader, or Commandant–General and First Honorary Corporal, of the Blackshirts, but executive functions were carried out by the Chief of Staff, equivalent to an army general. The MVSN was formed in imitation of the ancient Roman army, as follows:

Basic organisation
The terms after the first are not words common to European armies (e.g., the Italian battaglione has cognates in many languages). Instead, they derive from the structure of the ancient Roman army.
 Zona (zone) = division
 Legione (legion) = regiment, each legion was a militia unit consisting of a small active cadre and a large reserve of civilian volunteers.
 Coorte (cohort) =  battalion
 Centuria (centuria) = company
 Manipolo (maniple) = platoon
 Squadra (squad) = squad

These units were also organised on the triangular principle as follows:
 3 squadre = 1 manipolo (maniple)
 3 manipoli = 1 centuria (centuria)
 3 centuriae = 1 coorte (cohort)
 3 coorti = 1 legione (legion)
 3 legioni = 1 divisioni (field division)
 3 or more legioni = 1 zona (zone – an administrative division)

Territorial organisation

The MVSN original organisation consisted of 15 zones controlling 133 legions (one per province) of three cohorts each and one Independent Group controlling 10 legions. In 1929 it was reorganized into four raggruppamenti, but later in October 1936, it was reorganized into 14 zones controlling only 133 legions with two cohorts each one of men 21 to 36 years old and the other of men up to 55 years old. There were also special units in Rome, on Ponza Island and the black-uniformed Moschettieri del Duce ("The Leader's Musketeers", Mussolini's Guard), the Albanian Fascist Militia (four legions) and Milizia Coloniale in Africa (seven legions).

The original organisation by Royal Decrees on 1 February 1923 and 4 August 1924 consisted of fifteen zones, as follows:

1st Zone (Piedmont), HQ Turin
 first Sabauda - Turin              
 second Alpina - Turin                 
 third Subalpina - Cuneo              
 fourth Marengo - Alessandria        
 fifth Valle Scrivia - Tortona        
 eleventh Monferrato - Casale          
 twelfth Monte Bianco - Aosta
 twenty-eighth Randaccio - Vercelli
 twenty-ninth Alpina - Pallanza
 thirtieth Oddone - Novara
 thirty-seventh P. Prestinari - Turin
 thirty-eighth N. Alfieri - Asti
Second Zone (Lombardy) HQs Milan
Third Zone (Liguria) HQ Genoa
Fourth Zone (Venezia Tridentina) HQ Verona
Fifth Zone (Veneto) HQ Venice
Sixth Zone (Venezia Giulia) HQ Trieste
Seventh Zone (Emilia Romagna) HQ Bologna
Eighth Zone (Tuscany) HQ Florence
Ninth Zone (Umbria & Marche) HQ Perugia
Tenth Zone (Lazio) HQ Rome
Eleventh Zone (Abruzzo & Molise) HQ Pescara
Twelfth Zone (Campania) HQ Naples
Thirteenth Zone (Apulia) HQ Bari
Fourteenth Zone (Sicily) HQ Palermo
Fifteenth Zone (Sardinia) HQ Cagliari

Security militia
Special militias were also organised to provide security police and gendarmerie functions, these included:
 Forestry Militia
 Border Militia
 Highway Militia
 Port Militia
 Posts and Telegraph Militia
 Railway Militia
 University Militia
 Anti-aircraft and Coastal Artillery Militia, a combined command that controlled two militias:
 Anti-Aircraft Militia
 Coastal Artillery Militia

Standards 
The standards of each of the units of the Blackshirts, save for the Moschettieri del Duce, which carried a small standard in black similar to those of the regular armed forces, were a modernized form of the standards (Vexillum) used by the old Roman army.

Ethiopian campaign

During the 1935–36 Second Italo-Ethiopian War against the Ethiopian Empire, seven CCNN Divisions were organized:
 1st CC.NN. Division "23 Marzo" (23rd March)
 2nd CC.NN. Division "28 Ottobre" (28th October)
 3rd CC.NN. Division "21 Aprile" (21st April) 
 4th CC.NN. Division "3 Gennaio" (3rd January)
 5th CC.NN. Division "1 Febbraio" (1st February)
 6th CC.NN. Division "Tevere" (Tiber)
 7th CC.NN. Division "Cirene" (Cyrene)

The first six Divisions were sent to Ethiopia and participated in the war and in the Italian war crimes in Ethiopia. The seventh was deployed to Italian Libya but not fully equipped or trained before it was disbanded after the war had ended.

Division organisation

Organisation on 3 October 1935
 Divisional HQ
 3 x legions each with:
 legion HQ
 1 legionary machine gun company with 16 machine guns
 2 legionary infantry battalions, each with:
 1 machine gun company with 8 × 8 mm Breda machine guns and
 3 infantry companies each with 9 light machine guns and 3× 45 mm mortars
 1 pack-artillery battery with 4 × 65 mm L17 each.
 1 × artillery battalion (Army) with 3 batteries (65/17)
 1 × engineers company (mixed Army and Blackshirts)
 2 × replacements battalions (1 infantry, 1 mixed)
 1 × medical section
 1 × logistics section (food)
 1 × pack-mules unit (1600 mules)
 1 × mixed trucks unit (80 light trucks)

The Blackshirts Rifle Battalions had three rifle companies but no MMG company. The rifle companies had three platoons (three squads with one LMG each). Each Legion had an MMG company with four platoons of three weapons each (plus two spares). The Blackshirts replacement battalions were organised as the Blackshirts rifle battalions, but its platoons were overstrength (60 men each) and with only 1 × LMG in each platoon.

Organization on 10 June 1940
 Division Command
 2 Blackshirt legions - each
 3 battalions
 1 81 mm mortar company
 1 accompanying battery 65 mm/17 mtn guns
 1 machine gun battalion
 1 artillery regiment:
 2 artillery groups
 1 artillery group
 2 AA batteries 20mm
 1 mixed engineering battalion
 1 ambulance section sanita
 3 field hospitals (planned when available)
 1 supply section
 1 section mixed transport

Leadership

Spanish Civil War 
Three CCNN Divisions were sent to participate in the Spanish Civil War as part of the Corpo Truppe Volontarie. The Blackshirt (Camicie Nere, or CCNN) Divisions contained regular soldiers and volunteer militia from the Fascist Party. The CCNN divisions were semi-motorised.
 1st CC.NN. Division "Dio lo Vuole" ("God Wills it")
 2nd CC.NN. Division "Fiamme Nere" ("Black Flames")
 3rd CC.NN. Division "Penne Nere" ("Black Feathers")

The 3rd CCNN Division was disbanded and consolidated with the 2nd CCNN Division in April 1937 after their defeat at Guadalajara. After the campaigns in Northern Spain ended in October 1937, the 2nd CCNN Division was consolidated with the 1st CCNN and renamed the XXIII de Marzo Division "Llamas Negras".

World War II

In 1940 the MVSN was able to muster 340,000 first-line combat troops, providing three divisions (1st, 2nd and 4th – all three of which were lost in the North African Campaign) and, later in 1942, a fourth ("M") and fifth division Africa were formed.

Mussolini also pushed through plans to raise 142 MVSN combat battalions of 650 men each to provide a Gruppo di Assalto to each army division. The Gruppi consisted of two cohorts (each of three centuriae of three manipoli of two squadre each) plus Gruppo Supporto company of two heavy machine gun manipoli (with three HMG each) and two 81 mm mortar manipoli (with three mortars each).

Later forty-one mobile groups were raised to become the third regiment in Italian Army divisions as it was determined through operational experience that the Italian Army's binary divisions were too small in both manpower and heavy equipment. These mobile groups suffered heavy casualties due to being undermanned, underequipped and under-trained.

In 1941, Mussolini decided to create twenty-two highly trained combat battalions called "M" Battalions. These battalions were given the designation M alongside their names in the Army OOB to indicate their status; that they had received specialist assault and combat training, or had proven themselves in combat and had received a battlefield promotion to this status. By the end of the Fascist regime only eleven battalions had been fully formed.

The MVSN fought in every theatre Italy did.

Sixteen MVSN combat battalions served in Yugoslavia. Their numbers were: 3, 4, 8, 16, 29, 33, 54, 58, 61, 71, 81, 85, 115, 144, 162, 215. Six of the battalions which were distinguished in combat were designated M Battalions and those were the 8th, 16th, 29th, 71st, 81st, and 85th.

Appearance

The Blackshirts wore the same uniform as the Italian army with the addition of a black shirt and tie and a black fez. The uniform jacket had black flames with two ends on the collar in place of the insignia and the lictor bundles instead of the army's stars. There was an all-black dress uniform worn by some officers and the Moschettieri del Duce ("The Leader's Musketeers", Mussolini's Guard).

Ranks

All other ranks closely approximated those of the old Roman army as follows.

Legacy 

The ethos and sometimes the uniform were later copied by others who shared Mussolini's political ideas, including Adolf Hitler in Nazi Germany, who issued brown shirts to the "Storm Troops" (Sturmabteilung) and black uniforms to the "Defense Squad" (Schutzstaffel, also colloquially known as "Brownshirts", because they wore black suit-like tunics with brown shirts), Sir Oswald Mosley in the United Kingdom (whose British Union of Fascists were also known as the "Blackshirts"), the Warriors for the Advancement of the Bulgarian National Spirit who wore red shirts,  William Dudley Pelley in the United States (Silver Legion of America or "Silver Shirts"),  in Mexico the Camisas Doradas or "Golden Shirts",  Plínio Salgado in Brazil (whose followers wore green shirts), and Eoin O'Duffy in the Irish Free State (Army Comrades Association or "Blueshirts"). "Blueshirts" can also refer to Canadian fascists belonging to the Canadian National Socialist Unity Party, the Chinese Blue Shirts Society and to the members of Falange Española, the most influential party within Franco's dictatorship in Spain. The paramilitary fascist Iron Guard members in Romania and the fascist Yugoslav Radical Union wore green shirts.

After the Armistice of Cassibile was signed, the Blackshirts were dissolved; in the pro-fascist Italian Social Republic they were replaced by the National Republican Guard and the Black Brigades in the militia role, alongside the Republican Police Corps.

See also 
 Squadrismo
 Italian Social Republic
 Black Brigades
 Black Legion, often nicknamed as the "Blackshirts" or simply "Blacks" – Croatia
 Black Shortsparody of the Blackshirts in the writings of P.G. Wodehouse
 Blackshirts – Albania
 Redshirts – Bulgaria
 Blueshirts – Canada
 Blue Shirts – China (Kuomintang)
 Brownshirts – Nazi Germany
 Blackshirts – Nazi Germany
 Gestapo – Nazi Germany
 Blueshirts – Ireland
 Greenshirts – Ireland
 Greenshirts – United Kingdom
 Greenshirts – Yugoslavia
 Greenshirts – Brazil
 Redshirts – Italy
 Redshirts – Mexico
 Goldshirts – Mexico
 Greyshirts – ethnically Dutch South Africans
 Greenshirts – Romania
 Blackshirts – United Kingdom
 Silvershirts – United States
 Blueshirts - Spain
 Portuguese Legion
 Yokusan Sonendan – Japan

General 
 Militia
 Paramilitary
 Political color
 Political uniform
 Integralismo

Notes

External links 
 Axis History Factbook/Italy/Militia
 Comando Supremo

 
1919 establishments in Italy
1943 disestablishments in Italy
Clothing in politics
Military wings of fascist parties
Government paramilitary forces
Paramilitary organisations based in Italy
Fascist organizations